Chenar Barg (also Romanized as Chenār Barg; also known as Chenār Barg-e ‘Olyā) is a village in Jowzar Rural District, in the Central District of Mamasani County, Fars Province, Iran. At the 2006 census, its population was 95, in 23 families.

References 

Populated places in Mamasani County